The 2013 Skyrunner World Series was the 12th edition of the global skyrunning competition, Skyrunner World Series, organised by the International Skyrunning Federation from 2002. 

For the first time it is not assign an overall title but only those in the category.

Results

Category Sky

Category Ultra

Category Vertical

References

External links
 Skyrunner World Series

2013